Hurrikaani Loimaa is a Finnish volleyball team, located in Loimaa. Club play in highest level in Finland on volleyball, SM-league.

History 

Hurrikaani Loimaa rise to Finland volleyball league season 2007. Club won 1. division and continue to SM-league. First season in SM-league was success when the team advanced to play-off games. There the team lost to Pielaveden Sampo.

Team

Season 2008-2009

 Petteri Laurila 
 Kasper Vuorinen 
 Jukka Vehviläinen (C) 
 Vesa Mäkilä 
 Juha-Pekka Mikkola 
 Petri Tamminen 
 Jussi Uusitalo 
 Dan Kellum (United States)
 Teemu Tolonen 
 Mark Dusharme (United States)
 Mikko Lintula

Notable players 

 Petteri Laurila
 Jukka Vehviläinen
 Mark Dusharme

External links 

 (Finnish) Official website

Finnish volleyball clubs